Sky Ladder: The Art of Cai Guo-Qiang is a 2016 documentary film directed by Kevin Macdonald about the life and work of Cai Guo-Qiang known for his artwork with the help of gunpowder. The film was released by Netflix on October 14, 2016.

Premise
The story is told both through Cai Guo-Qiang's own words, as well as family, friends and observers of his craft, spanning from the artist's childhood in Mao's China just starting out, all the way to present day highly-publicized public art performances on a global scale.

Cast 
 Ian Buruma
 Guo-Qiang Cai
 Wen-You Cai
 Wenhao Cai
 Ben Davis
 Jeffrey Deitch
 Phil Grucci
 Thomas Krens
 Tatsumi Masatoshi
 Orville Schell
 Jennifer Wen Ma
 Hong Hong Wu
 Yimou Zhang

References

External links

 
 
 

2016 documentary films
2016 films
Netflix original documentary films
2010s English-language films